Rhinocyllus is a small genus of true weevil, with about 4 species described. This genus's host plant are thistles in the subtribe Carduinae. The genus's sister group is Bangasternus.

The genus's most infamous species is R. conicus which is a controversial agent of biological pest control which has been used against noxious thistles in the genera Carduus, Cirsium, Onopordum, and Silybum.

Partial list of species 
 Rhinocyllus conicus

References 

Lixinae